Tarzan's Tonsillitis (original title: La amigdalitis de Tarzán, 1999) is an epistolary novel from the Peruvian writer Alfredo Bryce.

Plot summary
It is about the romance between Fernanda and Juan Manuel del Carpio. It tells how life can pass and they keep in touch through the years only by mail. They meet sometimes in different cities of America and Europe but they never stay together for long. So they keep writing each other.

Spanish-language books
Epistolary novels
Peruvian novels
1999 novels